

P03A Ectoparasiticides, including scabicides

P03AA Sulfur containing products
P03AA01 Dixanthogen
P03AA02 Potassium polysulfide
P03AA03 Mesulfen
P03AA04 Disulfiram
P03AA05 Thiram
P03AA54 Disulfiram, combinations

P03AB Chlorine containing products
P03AB01 Clofenotane
P03AB02 Lindane
P03AB51 Clofenotane, combinations

P03AC Pyrethrines, including synthetic compounds
P03AC01 Pyrethrum
P03AC02 Bioallethrin
P03AC03 Phenothrin
P03AC04 Permethrin
P03AC51 Pyrethrum, combinations
P03AC52 Bioallethrin, combinations
P03AC53 Phenothrin, combinations
P03AC54 Permethrin, combinations

P03AX Other ectoparasiticides, including  scabicides
P03AX01 Benzyl benzoate
P03AX02 Copper oleinate
P03AX03 Malathion
P03AX04 Quassia
P03AX05 Dimeticone
P03AX06 Benzyl alcohol
P03AX07 Abametapir

P03B Insecticides and repellents

P03BA Pyrethrines
P03BA01 Cyfluthrin
P03BA02 Cypermethrin
P03BA03 Decamethrin
P03BA04 Tetramethrin

P03BX Other insecticides and repellents
P03BX01 Diethyltoluamide
P03BX02 Dimethylphthalate
P03BX03 Dibutylphthalate
P03BX04 Dibutylsuccinate
P03BX05 Dimethylcarbate
P03BX06 Etohexadiol

References

Insecticides
P03